Civic technology companies are platforms, products, and services that facilitate civic engagement. Civic technology encompasses any type of technology that enables greater participation in government affairs, or "assists government in delivering citizen services and strengthening ties with the public". The phrase can essentially be used to describe any company that is concerned with improving the quality, access, and efficiency of government services within the political system through technological means. Although similar, Civic Technology is different from Government Technology. Civic technology seeks to connect citizens with each other or with their government. Government Technology primarily seeks to increase the efficiency and effectiveness of governments' internal operations. Although the term can be used differently, Government Technology can also be classified as a subcategory within civic technology due to the indirect benefits citizens gain from government efficiency.

Categories of these companies 
Most current civic technology companies fall under a few categories. First is Government Technology, which is technology used by nations to either increase the efficiency of their operations or to enhance their connection to citizens. Another category is Advocacy, which is made up of civic technology companies used for political or social purposed by non-government groups. The last main category is Voting, which encompasses companies that seek to improve voting systems.

Civic Technology companies

Division of funding by company type 
Data on investment provided for civic technology companies from 2011 to 2013 offers insight into the current landscape of these technology companies. Data collected by the Knight Foundation in this time period analyzed the difference in funding between Open Government and Community Action civic technology companies. The Knight Foundation defines Open Government oriented companies as promoting citizen participation in government and Community Action companies as technology companies seeking to empower and unify citizens with a bottom-down approach. Of investment in this time period, Community Action civic technology companies received more funds than Open Government oriented civic technology companies. Within Community Action companies, Neighborhood Forums and P2P Local Sharing received most of the investment funds. Within Open Government civic technology companies, Data Access & Transparency companies and Resident Feedback companies received the largest share of investments within the Open Government category.

Possible future directions for civic technology companies 
As of 2021, various trends highlight the potential areas for growth civic technology can expand into. While many businesses assess data in real time, many governments lack the online infrastructure for this capability. Civic technology could play a pivotal role in more robust and frequent government data collection for its citizens. The gains of SpaceX highlighted the role private companies could play in developing technology for further space endeavors in coordination with the government. Furthermore, governments' increasing reliance on technology such as drones and software for military units show potential for military-focused civic technology companies to work with Governments. In the current landscape of civic technology companies, there remains potential for civic technology companies to improve diversity, equity, and inclusion for the community or communities they target. Civic technology could also connect younger citizens with their government. Specifically, since age groups under 30 primarily engage in their democracy through social media or other online platforms, online based civic technology companies could possibly increase engagement from these younger age groups. Furthermore, issues ranging from increasing school violence to increasing local environmental preservation concerns could also create high demand for civic technology companies to address these issues. Lastly, due to growing interest in and implementation of Participatory Budgeting and Citizens' Jury, there is greater demand and potential for civic technology companies that enable these practices on a massive scale.

See also 
 Civic technology
 Comparison of civic technology platforms
E-government
Government Technology

References

Technology companies
Types of business entity